KPMX (105.7 FM) is a radio station that broadcasts a hot adult contemporary music format. Licensed to Sterling, Colorado, United States, the station is owned and operated by Northeast Colorado Broadcasting, LLC.

History
The station was assigned the call sign KVRS on January 11, 1982. On October 10, 1984, the call sign was changed to KMXX. On May 7, 1990, the call sign was changed to the current KPMX.

References

External links

PMX
Sterling, Colorado